Aleph Producciones S.A. is a film production company in Buenos Aires, Argentina.

Filmography
 Adolescente, sucre d'amour (1985)
 Amico arabo, L' (1991)
 Un Muro de silencio (1993)
 Of Love and Shadows (1994)
 Amigomío (1994)
 Patrón (1995)
 Kanya Ya Ma Kan, Beyrouth (1995)
 Evita (1996)
 Un Asunto privado (1996)
 Dile a Laura que la quiero (1997)
 Sus ojos se cerraron y el mundo sigue andando (1998)
 Frontera Sur (1998)
 El evangelio de las maravillas (1998)
 Operación Fangio (1999)
 El Amateur (1999)
 Nueces para el amor (2000)
 El Despertar de L (2001)
 Sudeste (2001)
 El Séptimo arcángel (2003)
 Dolores de casada (2004)
 18-j (2004)
 ...al fin, el mar (2005)
 La Manos (2006)
 Suspiros del corazón (2006)

Footnotes

Film production companies of Argentina